Nael Eltoukhy (born 1978) is an Egyptian writer. He was born in Kuwait, and studied Hebrew at Ain Shams University. He has published five fiction books of and two books of translation (from Hebrew to Arabic). Notable works include Al Alfen wa seta (Two Thousand and Six, 2009) and Nisaa Al Karantina (Women of Karantina, 2013); the latter has been translated into English by Robin Moger.

References

Egyptian writers
1978 births
Living people
Date of birth missing (living people)
Ain Shams University alumni